King's Own Rifles may refer to:

 King's Royal Rifle Corps, a British Army infantry regiment
 The King's Own Rifles of Canada, a Canadian Army infantry regiment now named The Saskatchewan Dragoons.